Fire & Movement: The Forum of Conflict Simulation was a magazine devoted to wargames, both traditional board wargames and computer wargames. It was founded by Rodger MacGowan in 1975, and began publication the following year.

In February 1982, Fire & Movement was acquired by Steve Jackson Games. In January 1985 the magazine was sold again to Diverse Talents Inc. (DTI). In 1988, World Wide Wargames (also known as 3W) acquired Diverse Talents Inc. (DTI), publisher of Fire & Movement, Battleplan and Space Gamer, leading to a complete merger of the two companies. 3W then continued on to publish four gaming magazines simultaneously. John Vanore was the only "outsider" appointed to editorial duties, taking the reins of F&M at the time.

F&M is now published by Decision Games. In January 2010, the last "print" edition of the magazine was published. Editing and layout had been outsourced to Jon Compton to preserve the independence of the magazine content, but subscriptions and newsstand sales continued to decline. As of February 2010, Fire & Movement had been redesignated as an online magazine, and is undergoing retooling. Editorial duties have since been assigned to Eric Harvey.

F&M was inducted into the Academy of Adventure Gaming Arts & Design's Hall of Fame in 1999.

Beginnings
Rodger B. MacGowan started wargaming when he was in high school in the late 1960s.  After a hiatus due to the Vietnam War (in his words, "girls also had a major impact"), he returned to the hobby in the 1970s with his old playing partners, who had now moved to different cities. They started to correspond with each other about gaming, and MacGowan started to detail the games in a format he referred to as "Battle Report". He included maps and analyses of his games, and his reports proved to be so popular with his friends that he expanded his concept to create his first magazine, entitled Arquebus. Many of the concepts that F&M would later make famous were included, such as game reviews, game reports, hobby news, and feedback analysis from readers. As he became more involved in the writing of Arquebus, a friend suggested "going professional". Using his background as a professional graphic designer in both advertising and magazine production, he approached Baron Publishing Company, who expressed interest in printing the magazine, as long as MacGowan did the work.

MacGowan next contacted Mark Saha, who wrote for The General and Moves magazines.  Since he was playtesting the next big release from Avalon Hill — Tobruk — he was able to provide an "inside scoop" for the first issue of F&M. Another concept was born with the first edition, when a copy of the review for Tobruk was sent to the actual developer of the game for fact checking and it was decided to publish his reply word for word. The technique of having developers respond in print to reviews, in the same issue, would be repeated many times over the years.

The title "Fire & Movement" comes from a standard military expression, and MacGowan noticed it as a chapter heading in a military manual and decided it would be more appropriate and recognizable than Arquebus.

Reception
Fire & Movement won the Charles S. Roberts Award for Best Professional Magazine of 1978, of 1979, of 1980, and of 1982.

Reviews
Phoenix #7 (May/June 1977)

References

External links
 Decision Games

Monthly magazines published in the United States
Online magazines published in the United States
Defunct magazines published in the United States
Magazines disestablished in 2010
Magazines established in 1975
Online magazines with defunct print editions
Origins Award winners
Wargaming magazines